Maxim Knight (born August 21, 1999) is an American actor who started acting at the age of seven. He is perhaps best known for his supporting role on the TNT television series Falling Skies (2011–2015).

Biography

Maxim was born in Honolulu, Hawaii.  He moved to Los Angeles at the age of five.

Career
Knight started acting in films at the age of eight. His first role was in All for Melissa in 2007 as Little Jared.  He has also appeared in shorts including Gator Armstrong Plays with Dolls, Al’s Beef, How My Dad Killed Dracula, and Number One Dad.  He guest starred in his first role,  The Cleaner (TV series) in 2009 as Aidan Kearn.  He also starred in such television shows as Criminal Minds, Brothers & Sisters, Special Agent Oso and Sofia the First as Prince Desmond.

In 2011, he joined the cast of TNT's new sci-fi series Falling Skies, as Tom Mason's son Matt Mason. He was a series regular in all five seasons.

At the age of seven, Knight booked his first feature film, starring opposite Melissa Leo, Nick Cannon, Rosanna Arquette & Chris "Ludacris" Bridges in Ball Don't Lie. Maxim portrayed "Sticky", a young boy who is witness to his mother's suicide and has to face and ultimately triumph over life's challenges and unfair circumstances.

Filmography

Awards and nominations

References

External links

TVGuide Celebrity
Maxim Knight Talks TNT "Falling Skies"

1999 births
Living people
American male film actors
American male television actors
American male child actors
21st-century American male actors